Kenan Ragipović  (born 16 November 1982) is a Serbian professional footballer who plays for FK Tutin in Serbian League West.

Career
Born in Novi Pazar, SR Serbia, Ragipović started his football career with FK Novi Pazar. He played for Paya Lebar Punggol FC in the S. League during 2005. He moved back to FK Novi Pazar in the Serbian First League for the 2006-07 season, and played for Gloria Bistrița in the Romanian Liga I during the 2007-08 season. After that he played in the FCM Târgu Mureș in the Romanian Liga I. 2009 he moved to Albania and played in first division in FK Apolonia Fier. In 2010, he played in Albanian Superliga with KS Kastrioti.

In summer 2011 he returned to Serbia and made his debut in the Serbian SuperLiga by playing with FK Hajduk Kula during the 2011–12 season.  However, in the following summer he would move abroad again, this time to join Montenegrin side OFK Grbalj.

Ahead of the 2019/20 season, Ragipović joined FK Sloga Kraljevo. However, after only one league appearance, he left Kraljevo and joined FK Tutin.

References

External links
 Kenan Ragipović Stats at Utakmica.rs
 

1982 births
Living people
Sportspeople from Novi Pazar
Bosniaks of Serbia
Serbian footballers
Association football midfielders
FK Novi Pazar players
Serbian expatriate footballers
Expatriate footballers in Singapore
Hougang United FC players
Serbian expatriate sportspeople in Singapore
Expatriate footballers in Romania
Liga I players
ACF Gloria Bistrița players
Serbian expatriate sportspeople in Romania
ASA 2013 Târgu Mureș players
Expatriate footballers in Albania
KF Apolonia Fier players
Serbian expatriate sportspeople in Albania
FK Hajduk Kula players
Serbian SuperLiga players
OFK Grbalj players
KS Kastrioti players
FK Mladost Velika Obarska players
FK Mornar players
OFK Petrovac players
FK Sloga Kraljevo players
Singapore Premier League players
FK Tutin players